Khorram (also known as Khorramābād) is a village in Emamzadeh Abdol Aziz Rural District, Jolgeh District, Isfahan County, Isfahan Province, Iran. At the 2006 census, its population was 264, in 77 families.

References 

Populated places in Isfahan County